Animal Medical Center or (AMC) may refer to:

 Animal Medical Center of New York, a non profit animal hospital in New York City
 Angell Animal Medical Center in Boston, MA